Simone Petilli (born 4 May 1993) is an Italian cyclist, who currently rides for UCI WorldTeam . Petilli signed a contract to join the  team for the 2016 season. He was named in the start list for the 2016 Giro d'Italia.

Major results

2010
 5th Trofeo Città Di Ivrea
2011
 2nd Trofeo San Rocco
 3rd Overall Tre Ciclistica Internazionale Bresciana
2012
 5th Trofeo Franco Balestra
2013
 1st  Mountains classification Giro della Valle d'Aosta
 4th Trofeo Internazionale Bastianelli
 6th Trofeo Banca Popolare di Vicenza
 6th Gran Premio Palio del Recioto
 9th Giro del Belvedere
2014
 1st   Young rider classification Settimana Internazionale Coppi e Bartali
2015
 1st  Overall Ronde de l'Isard
1st Stage 1
 1st  Young rider classification Settimana Internazionale Coppi e Bartali
 2nd Trofeo Edil C
 3rd Overall Giro della Valle d'Aosta Mont Blanc
 3rd GP Laguna
 3rd Giro del Medio Brenta
 5th Overall Tour de l'Avenir
 5th Piccolo Giro di Lombardia
 7th Giro dell'Appennino
 7th Trofeo Banca Popolare di Vicenza
 9th Trofeo Laigueglia
 10th Gran Premio della Costa Etruschi
2016
 7th Giro dell'Appennino
 10th GP Industria & Artigianato di Larciano
2017
 10th Gran Premio della Costa Etruschi
2018
 9th Overall Adriatica Ionica Race
2019
 10th Overall Giro di Sicilia
2022
 9th Strade Bianche

Grand Tour general classification results timeline

References

External links

1993 births
Italian male cyclists
Living people
Cyclists from the Province of Lecco